Kalo Nero or Kalonero ( meaning "good water") is a village and a community of the Trifylia municipality, Messenia, southern Greece. The population of the entire community is 686 (2011 census), the main village alone 543, the remaining 143 living in the smaller settlements Ano Kalo Nero, Kakavas, Stasi Sidirokastro (Sidirokastro station, a railway halt), Marmaro and Vounaki.

Geography
Kalo Nero is situated on the Gulf of Kyparissia, a bay of the Ionian Sea. It is 6 km northeast of Kyparissia, 21 km south of Zacharo and 47 km northwest of Kalamata. The Greek National Road 9 (Patras - Pyrgos - Pylos), and the main road to Kalamata pass through the town. Kalo Nero is a railway junction where the line from Patras and Pyrgos in the north branches to the terminus station of Kyparissia to the south and towards Kalamata via Zevgolatio in the east. Kalo Nero has a relatively large railway yard, located alongside the central square of the village, with the station building at the southern end of the square. Kalo Nero used to have several daily passenger train services but during recent years these have been reduced until 21-Jan-2011 the last remaining services were closed down.

Tourism and the environment
Kalo Nero has a 20 kilometre sandy beach which attracts a moderate amount bathers in the summer months, both Greeks and foreign tourists. On the seafront there are a number hotels, tavernas and bars. Loggerhead sea turtles, Caretta caretta, nest every summer on the beach from many centuries ago, from May to July - with the nests hatching between July and October. Kalo Nero is famous for its marvelous, unique sunsets in the Kyparissian Bay. Nearby are the Mycenian Tombs in Peristeria and the Neda River Waterfalls with Stomio, the entrance to Hades , the underworld, according to Greek Mythology.

References

Populated places in Messenia